The Charles River in Massachusetts has a significant number of boathouses on its banks, from its mouth at Boston Harbor to its source at Echo Lake in Hopkinton.

The boathouses are mostly situated along the Boston and Cambridge banks of the Charles River Basin, upstream as far as the Arsenal Street Bridge, and downstream as far as the Charles River Dam. Many of the boathouses belong to universities, including Boston University, Harvard University, the Massachusetts Institute of Technology, and Northeastern University. Other boathouses belong to private clubs, some of which date back to the 19th century, while others belong to non-profit organizations dedicated to making the river accessible to the public for various types of boating. There are a modest number of for-profit boathouses that offer public boating services on the river above the Watertown Dam. Charles River Canoe & Kayak, which operates a boathouse in Newton, also provides rental services at other locations on the river.

The biggest event of the year involving the boathouses is the Head of the Charles Regatta, held every October. The houses see usage nearly year-round, weather permitting and pending the icing over of the Charles in winter months.

Listings
This list starts from the mouth of the river, with the first house near the Charles River Dam Bridge, and continues upstream. The nearest crossing to each boathouse is marked with an asterisk (*).

References

External links
Sparks Consulting College Rowing Database

Boathouse list
Charles River list
Charles River boathouses
Charles River boathouses